The 23rd Critics' Choice Awards were presented on January 11, 2018 at the Barker Hangar at the Santa Monica Airport, honoring the finest achievements of filmmaking and television programming in 2017. The ceremony was broadcast on The CW and hosted by Olivia Munn. The nominations were announced on December 6, 2017. Netflix led with 20 nominations, followed by HBO with 15.

Winners and nominees

Film

#SeeHer Award
Gal Gadot

Television

Films with multiple nominations and wins

The following twenty-six films received multiple nominations:

The following six films received multiple awards:

Television programs with multiple nominations and wins

The following programs received multiple nominations:

The following programs received multiple awards:

References

External links
 23rd Annual Critics' Choice Awards – Winners

Broadcast Film Critics Association Awards
2017 film awards
2018 in California
January 2018 events in the United States